Adam Stefanów (born 22 March 1994 in Nowa Sól, Lubuskie) is a Polish former professional snooker player. Stefanow lives in Sheffield, England. He received an Invitational Tour Card after finishing runner-up in the 2018 WSF Championship. His two-year card started in the 2018/2019 season.

Career
Stefanow won enough matches at Q School in 2016 to be given a place in a number of ranking tournaments in the 2016/17 season as an amateur. He recorded wins against Ben Woollaston in the Riga Masters, James Cahill in the Scottish Open and Michael Wild in the 2017 Welsh Open.

He was largely unsuccessful at Q School in 2017 in comparison to the previous year and therefore wasn't able to compete in any professional tournaments of note in the 2017/18 season, however, he finished runner-up in the WSF Championship in March 2018 which saw him receive a place in both the qualifying draw in the 2018 World Championship and a full tour card for the following two seasons.  He won his first round tie at 2018 World Championship qualifying 10–8 against Gary Wilson, before losing out 4–10 against Thepchaiya Un-Nooh. 

His first full season on tour was relatively quiet, winning just two matches all season, one however of which was quite a notable 6-4 win against Shaun Murphy in qualifying for the China Open. Over in China in the venue stages he was defeated in the Last 64 1-6 by Andrew Higginson. 

In the 2019/20 season he defeated former two-time ranking event winner Michael White 4-0 to qualify for the Riga Masters but was defeated 1-4 by Liam Highfield in Riga. His final professional win that season was a 4-1 win over Luca Brecel in the English Open. 

He dropped off the tour at the end of the season. He entered Q School in August 2020 to try and regain his tour card, but withdrew from each tournament before it began, possibly due to Covid-19 travel restrictions at the time and has since not entered any amateur or professional snooker tournament.

Performance and rankings timeline

Career finals

Amateur finals: 2 (1 title)

References

External links

Adam Stefanow at worldsnooker.com

Polish snooker players
Living people
1994 births
People from Zielona Góra